The 2004–05 Alabama Crimson Tide men's basketball team (variously "Alabama", "UA", "Bama" or "The Tide") represented the University of Alabama in the 2004–05 college basketball season. The head coach was Mark Gottfried, who was in his seventh season at Alabama. The team played its home games at Coleman Coliseum in Tuscaloosa, Alabama and was a member of the Southeastern Conference. This was the 92nd season of basketball in the school's history. The Crimson Tide finished the season 24–8, 12–4 in SEC play, lost in the semifinals of the 2005 SEC men's basketball tournament. They were invited to the NCAA tournament and lost in the first round.

Schedule and results

|-
!colspan=12 style=|Exhibition

|-
!colspan=12 style=|Non-conference regular season

|-
!colspan=12 style=|SEC regular season

|-
!colspan=12 style=| SEC tournament

|-
!colspan=12 style="background:#990000; color:#FFFFFF;"|  NCAA tournament

See also
2005 NCAA Division I men's basketball tournament
2004–05 NCAA Division I men's basketball season
2004–05 NCAA Division I men's basketball rankings

References

Alabama
Alabama Crimson Tide men's basketball seasons
2004 in sports in Alabama
Alabama Crimson Tide
Alabama